
Gołdap County is a unit of territorial administration and local government (powiat) in Warmian-Masurian Voivodeship, northern Poland, on the border with Russia.

When powiats were re-introduced in the Polish local government reforms of 1999, the present Gołdap and Olecko Counties made up a single entity (called powiat olecko-gołdapski or Olecko-Gołdap County). This was divided into two in 2002.

As of 2019 its total population is 26,825, out of which the population of Gołdap is 13,716 and the rural population is 13,109.

Neighbouring counties
Gołdap County is bordered by Suwałki County to the east, Olecko County to the south, Giżycko County to the south-west and Węgorzewo County to the west. It also borders Russia (Kaliningrad Oblast) to the north.

Administrative division
The county is subdivided into three gminas (one urban-rural and two rural). These are listed in the following table, in descending order of population.

References

 
Land counties of Warmian-Masurian Voivodeship